The Lada Granta 1600T WTCC is a racing car built under Super 2000 specifications, which will be competing in the FIA World Touring Car Championship.

History

In the 2009 World Touring Car Championship, Lada Sport entered 3 Lada 110s and Lada Prioras, where the team saw moderate success. In 2010 the team pulled out of WTCC.

Lada returned to the championship in 2012 with James Thompson driving the car in selected events, and in 2013, Mikhail Kozlovskiy joined Thompson in the Granta's first full WTCC season.

The car is based on the Lada Granta Cup car which is a single-make trophy, with races held mostly in Russia and the neighbouring countries.

Compared to the cup car the WTCC car is fitted with a 1.6 litre turbocharged engine and the body and suspension is modified to comply with the WTCC rules.

The car was tested in Magny-Cours track in April, 2012, and debuted in the 2012 FIA WTCC Race of Hungary in May, 2012.

It was modified for entry into the 2014 World Touring Car Championship under the new TC1 regulations. It took 2 wins in the hands of Rob Huff, at Beijing Goldenport and Macau.

External links 
 Official website of the Lada Sport WTCC
 Official website of Lada Sport
 Official Greek website of Lada Sport
 Official website of the WTCC

Cars of Russia
Granta WTCC
Racing cars
Cars introduced in 2012
Touring cars